The Royal Agricultural University (RAU), formerly the Royal Agricultural College, is a public university in Cirencester, Gloucestershire, England. Established in 1845, it was the first agricultural college in the English-speaking world. The university provides more than 30 land-based undergraduate and postgraduate programmes to students from over 45 countries through the School of Agriculture, the School of Business and Entrepreneurship, the School of Equine and the School of Real Estate and Land Management.

History
The Royal Agricultural University was founded as the Royal Agricultural College in 1842, at a meeting of the Fairford and Cirencester Farmers’ Club. Concerned by the lack of government support for education, Robert Jeffreys-Brown addressed the meeting on "The Advantages of a Specific Education for Agricultural Pursuits". A prospectus was circulated, a general committee was appointed and Henry Bathurst, 4th Earl Bathurst was elected president. Funds were raised by public subscription: much of the support came from the wealthy landowners and farmers of the day, and there was no government support. Construction of the main building, in Victorian Tudor style, began in April 1845 and was designed by S. W. Daukes and John R. Hamilton, and built by Thomas Bridges of Cirencester. The first 25 students were admitted to the college in September 1845.

Queen Victoria granted a royal charter to the college in 1845 and sovereigns have been patrons ever since, visiting the college in every reign. King Charles III became president in 1982.

The college gained full university status in 2013 and changed its name accordingly. It had  students in the  academic year and saw a 49% rise in applications between 2008 and 2013. The 2022 National Student Survey (NSS) ranked the RAU 1st for Learning Community (UK Universities) and 4th for Overall Satisfaction (English Universities).

Farms
The university operates two farms close to the campus: 
 Coates Manor Farm is predominantly arable cropped with some pasture land.
 Fossehill Farm provides polo and hunter livery stabling and associated exercise facilities.
Harnhill Manor Farm was purchased in 2009 and with Coates Manor Farm totals 491 hectares (1223 acres) of land. The farm was managed organically for many years but all the land apart from the outdoor-pig unit was taken out of organic management. In 2011, an old sheep shed at the front of the farm complex was turned into the 'John Oldacre Rural Innovation Centre' a building designed for the training of students and members of the public in vocational skills such as rough-terrain forklift truck driving, blacksmithing, chainsaw and welding course, etc. The building cost £1.2 Million to transform. The JORIC was officially opened in March 2014 by Sir John Beddington and the site was visited in November 2013 by Prince Charles.

Sport
The university has a range of sports facilities on campus, including a gym, an all-weather pitch, and squash and tennis courts. Students participate in a wide range of sports including; clay pigeon shooting, cricket, equestrian, field sports (hunting, fishing and shooting), football, golf, lacrosse, hockey, netball, polo, rugby, rifle shooting, rowing, tennis and yachting. However, most sports have been banned from BUCS League, and rugby has even been banned on campus. .

The Royal Agricultural University is just one of three remaining British universities (the others being the University of Cambridge and the University of Oxford) to maintain their own beagle pack. Founded in 1889, the RAU Beagles is run by the students who whip in and hunt the hounds, and until the 2004 hunting ban, hunted hares in the countryside around Cirencester.

Research
In the Research Excellence Framework (REF) 2021, 52% of the University’s research was classed as 3* or 4* meaning it is world-leading or internationally excellent. In addition, half of the University’s scientific publications were deemed to be of international quality. In Research England's Knowledge Exchange Framework, the University was grouped into the STEM cluster – small specialist universities in medicine, science, and engineering – ranking second out of the nine institutions in the cluster. The University was recognised as having very high or high engagement in five of the seven criteria on which it was judged.

Library
The university library holds around 40,000 print volumes, nearly 1,000 current journal subscriptions, more than 40,000 e-books and a growing number of full-text databases. The main collection is supplemented by a support collection and a historical collection of texts, primarily on agriculture and estate/land management, dating back to the 16th century. The library also holds the RAU archive, a collection of documents relating to the institution since its foundation.

Patrons
The patron of RAU was until 1982 the current reigning British monarch, at which point King Charles, the then heir apparent to the British throne, and current King of the United Kingdom took on this role.

1845–1901 – Queen Victoria
1901–1910 – King Edward VII
1910–1936 – King George V
1936 – King Edward VIII
1936–1952 – King George VI
1952–1982 – Queen Elizabeth II
1982–present –  King Charles III

Notable people

Staff
James Buckman – professor of geology, botany, and zoology from 1848 to 1863.
John D. Custance – professor of agricultural science in the late 1870s, later was responsible for establishing Roseworthy Agricultural College in South Australia.
John Scott, on the staff shortly from 1880, later became known as a tractor pioneer.
Sir Emrys Jones, former chief adviser to the Minister of Agriculture from 1967 to 1973, and director of the Government's Agricultural and Development Advisory Service (ADAS), was principal of the college from 1973 until 1978. He described his time at Cirencester as the most enjoyable period in his life. In 2011, a new teaching facility at the college was named in his honour. For university applicants with a connection to Wales, a scholarship has been set up that carries the former principal's name.
Edward William Prevost, Professor of Chemistry 1879 to 1881 then retired to be a farmer
George Stephen West (1876–1919), professor of natural history 1899–1906
John Wrightson (1840–1916), founder of Downton Agricultural College

Alumni

Royal Agricultural University graduates have won a number of awards and prizes, including the Farmers Weekly Young Farmer Of The Year Award (James Price 2009 and Adrian Ivory 2008).

Notable students from the institution include:

Arts and Media
Mark Bence-Jones, writer
Jonathan Dimbleby, television personality and political commentator
Dwijendralal Ray Bengali poet
Teddy McDonald, contemporary artist

Peerage
Sir John Agnew, 6th Baronet
Sir Euan Anstruther-Gough-Calthorpe, 3rd Baronet
Derek Barber, Baron Barber of Tewkesbury
Alan Brooke, 3rd Viscount Brookeborough
Jeremy Browne, 11th Marquess of Sligo
Torquhil Campbell, 13th Duke of Argyll
Robin Cayzer, 3rd Baron Rotherwick, one of the 92 hereditary peers elected to remain in the House of Lords
Sir Thomas Chapman, 7th Baronet
Patrick Chichester, 8th Marquess of Donegall
David Cunliffe-Lister, 2nd Earl of Swinton
Robin Dundas, Earl of Ronaldshay
Francis Egerton, 7th Duke of Sutherland
Nicholas Guy Halsey
James Hamilton, 5th Duke of Abercorn
Gustavus Hamilton-Russell, 10th Viscount Boyne
Lord Nicholas Hervey
Charles Kennedy, 5th Marquess of Ailsa
Prince Jonah Kuhio Kalanianaole of Hawaii
John Lowry-Corry, 8th Earl Belmore
John Lyttelton, 11th Viscount Cobham
David Ogilvy, 13th Earl of Airlie
William Peel, 3rd Earl Peel
Eric Saumarez, 7th Baron de Saumarez
Malcolm Sinclair, 20th Earl of Caithness
Henry Somerset, 12th Duke of Beaufort
FitzRoy Somerset, 5th Baron Raglan
John Spencer, 8th Earl Spencer
James Spencer-Churchill, 12th Duke of Marlborough
Patrick Stopford, 9th Earl of Courtown
Luke White, 6th Baron Annaly
Sir John Wills, 4th Baronet

Politics
Stuart Agnew, UK Independence Party MEP
Richard Benyon, Member of Parliament
William Bridges-Maxwell, Australian politician
Sandy Bruce-Lockhart
Julian Cayo-Evans
Michael Colvin, former Member of Parliament
Simon Coveney, Tánaiste, Minister for Foreign Affairs and Trade and Deputy Leader of Fine Gael 
Richard Drax, Member of Parliament
Simon Hart, Member of Parliament for Carmarthen West and South Pembrokeshire
Timothy Kitson, former MP
Roger Knapman, former leader of UKIP
Arthur Nichols, Australian politician
Joseph-Xavier Perrault
Henry Plumb, Baron Plumb, former chairman of the NFU and politician
James Provan, former MEP
Edward Cephas John Stevens
Noel Stirling Austin Arnold Wallinger

Sports
Algernon Bligh. Somerset County cricketer
Mark Anthony Peter Phillips,  former husband of the Princess Royal, Great Britain equestrian rider, cross country course designer
Jason Little, Australian rugby union player
Ben Clarke, England, British Lions and Bath rugby union player
Tim Payne, England, British Lions and Wasps rugby union player
Peter Walton, Scotland, British Lions and Newcastle rugby union player
Marcus Armytage, National Hunt jockey
Henry Cecil, race horse trainer
Aubrey Jackman, tattooist
Nigel Gadsby, England cricketer
Arthur Sclater, Sussex County cricketer
Richard Nancekivell, Cornwall and Northampton Saints rugby union player
John Pullin, England, British Lions and Bristol rugby union Player
Andrew Balding, racehorse trainer
Nicky Henderson, racehorse trainer
Lisa Wooding, England and Great Britain hockey player, Olympian
Mike Tucker, equestrian and agricultural show commentator

Other
Richard Abel Smith
Miguel de Avendaño
James Buckman
Charlotte Clark
Michael Coulson (barrister)
Tim Heywood
Chris Keeble, soldier, The Parachute Regiment and Harris Manchester College, University of Oxford]]
Eleanor Anne Ormerod
Edward Packard (businessman, born 1843), son of the founder of Fisons fertiliser
Baron Rathcreedan, pedigree cow auctioneer
Sir Wilfred de Soysa
Augustus Voelcker, professor of agricultural chemistry
John Wrightson, founder of Downton Agricultural College

References

External links

Official website

 
Education in Gloucestershire
Agricultural College
Agricultural universities and colleges in the United Kingdom
Educational institutions established in 1845
1845 establishments in England
Cirencester